75th Street may refer to:

In New York City
75th Street (Manhattan)
75th Street – Elderts Lane (BMT Jamaica Line)

Elsewhere
75th Street (Grand Crossing) (Metra), Chicago